Arctic Pacific Lakes Provincial Park is a provincial park in British Columbia, Canada, protecting a pair of lakes known as Arctic and Pacific Lakes, which as their name indicate are on the divide between the Pacific and Arctic drainages.  Inherently, the Continental Divide runs between the two lakes, which lie in a narrow valley amid the rugged mountains of the northwesternmost McGregor Plateau.  The pass formed by the lakes was important during early fur trade operations and was one of the main links between New Caledonia and the fur companies' eastern territories beyond the Rockies.

The park is located 90 kilometres northeast of Prince George, British Columbia and is 13,887 ha. in area.

History and conservation
The park was established June 29, 2000.

The parks aims to protect fall and spring grizzly bear populations, and year-round caribou habitat, as well as fish populations including lake trout, bull trout, rainbow trout, kokanee, dolly varden, mountain whitefish, redside shiner, lake trout, chinook salmon, and Arctic grayling. The secondary role of the park is to protect the 1793 route of Alexander Mackenzie through the continental divide.

External links

Provincial parks of British Columbia
Central Interior of British Columbia
Great Divide of North America
2000 establishments in British Columbia
Protected areas established in 2000